During the 19th and 20th centuries, hundreds of French-language newspapers, many short-lived, were published in the United States by Franco-Americans, immigrants from Canada, France, and other French-speaking countries. In New England alone, more than 250 journals had been established and ceased publication before 1940. In the latter half of the 20th century Americanization, the adoption of mass media and the English only movement resulted in a severe decline in French-language newspapers, with many defunct by the end of the Second World War. Of those extant today, many originate from French-Canadian and Haitian-American communities living in the United States.

Current
This is list of French language newspapers which are presently being published in the United States:

Defunct

References

Further reading

 
 
 
  (Issue also includes other lists related to French-language Louisiana newspapers)
 

Newspapers
Newspapers
Newspapers

French
French-Canadian culture in the United States